Gitansh Khera (born 4 June 1991) is an Indian cricketer who plays for Punjab. He made his List A debut on 27 February 2014, for Punjab in the 2013–14 Vijay Hazare Trophy.

References

External links
 

1991 births
Living people
Indian cricketers
Punjab, India cricketers
Sri Lanka Police Sports Club cricketers
Cricketers from Ludhiana
Wicket-keepers